Boev is a surname. Notable people with the surname include:

 Igor Boev (born 1989), Russian cyclist
 Vasko Boev (born 1988),  Bulgarian footballer 
 Nikolay Boev (1922 - 1985), Bulgarian zoologist
 Zlatozar Boev (born 1955), Bulgarian ornithologist, paleontologist, and zoologist (son of Nikolay Boev)